Scilla Lighthouse is an active lighthouse in Calabria just opposite of Capo Peloro Lighthouse which is on the Sicilian coast; both lighthouses direct the ships from the north into the Strait of Messina. The lighthouse is settled on the seaward side terrace of the Castello Ruffo di Scilla, in the town of Scilla on the Tyrrhenian Sea.

Description
The tower is painted white with a black band at the base, the lantern dome is grey metallic.

The lighthouse is completely automated and managed by the Marina Militare with the identification code number 2712 E.F.

See also
 List of lighthouses in Italy

References

External links

 Servizio Fari Marina Militare 

Lighthouses in Italy
Buildings and structures in Reggio Calabria
Lighthouses completed in 1913
1913 establishments in Italy